This is a comprehensive list of songs by the American rock band All Time Low.

Original songs

Covers

Unreleased original songs

References

 *
All Time Low